KNHK-FM (101.9 FM, "101.9 Hank FM") is a radio station broadcasting a classic country music format. Licensed to Weston, Oregon, United States, the station is currently owned by Alexandra Communications.

History
The station signed on the air in 1997 as KZZM. On February 3, 2005, the station changed its call sign to KMMG. On March 1, 2006, it changed to KUJJ.

On December 20, 2011, KUJJ changed its format from smooth jazz to contemporary hits, branded as "New Zoo 102". On January 1, 2012, KUJJ changed its call sign to KZIU-FM.

On October 18, 2015, KZIU flipped to classic country as "101.9 Hank FM".

On October 12, 2021, KZIU-FM changed its call sign to KNHK-FM.

Translators
KNHK-FM also broadcasts on the following translators:

K233CJ 94.5 FM College Place relays KNHK-HD3.
K283BU 104.5 FM Walla Walla relays KNHK-HD4.

HD Radio
KNHK-FM airs the following formats on its HD sub channels: adult alternative "106.9 The Oasis" on HD2, Fox Sports Radio on HD3 and adult hits ("104.5 Bob FM") on HD4.

References

External links

Classic country radio stations in the United States
NHK-FM
Umatilla County, Oregon
1997 establishments in Oregon
Radio stations established in 1997